Distributed social network projects generally develop software, protocols, or both.


Projects

Clients

Dead or stalled projects

Other federated communication or storage solutions

References

Social networks
Distributed computing architecture
Peer-to-peer
Distributed social networking